Victor Basile is an American LGBT rights activist who was the first executive director of the Human Rights Campaign (then the Human Rights Campaign Fund), serving in that position from June 1983 to June 1989.

Basile works as a Counselor to the Director of the United States Office of Personnel Management.

Past 
Prior to HRC, Basile had been president of an American Federation of State, County and Municipal Employees local union based in Washington, D.C.

Basile has been, at least in the past, a supporter of outing gay politicians who work against LGBT rights. In 1989, the Washington Post quoted him as saying "Those who participate in the (gay) community and then vote against it are guilty of hypocrisy-hypocrisy that causes harm to a whole class of people. They are like Jews who put other Jews into the ovens. . . . Their duplicitous, devious, harmful behavior ought to be exposed."

Basile remained on the board of HRC and has been involved in recruiting efforts for later heads of the HRC, such as the efforts which selected Joe Solmonese and Cheryl Jacques.

Basile was an executive producer of the 1989 documentary After Stonewall.

Basile was, along with William Waybourn, was a co-founder of the Gay & Lesbian Victory Fund, which works toward the election of gay and lesbian political candidates.

Basile was later executive director of the Baltimore-area charity, Movable Feast, which delivers meals to HIV and AIDS patients who can't leave their homes.

References

Living people
American LGBT rights activists
American Federation of State, County and Municipal Employees people
Year of birth missing (living people)